The United States Senate election in Illinois was held on November 5, 2002. Incumbent Democratic U.S. Senator Dick Durbin sought re-election to a second term in the United States Senate. Durbin defeated Republican challenger State Representative Jim Durkin in a landslide.

Election information
The primaries and general elections coincided with those for House and those for state offices.

Turnout

For the primary elections, turnout was 24.66%, with 1,743,698 votes cast. For the general election, turnout was 49.50%, with 3,486,851 votes cast.

Democratic primary

Candidates 
 Dick Durbin, incumbent U.S. Senator

Results

Republican primary

Candidates 
 Jim Durkin, Illinois State Representative
 Jim Oberweis, owner of Oberweis Dairy
 John H. Cox, businessman

Results

General election

Debates
Complete video of debate, October 23, 2002

Predictions

Polling

Results 
Durbin won re-election to a second term easily, carrying a majority of the state's 102 counties.

See also 
 2002 United States Senate election

Notes

References 

Illinois
2002
2002 Illinois elections